The Tulsa School of Arts and Sciences, also known as "TSAS", is a public charter school founded in 2001, serving grades 6-12 in Tulsa, Oklahoma. Enrollment is approximately 525 students, and as a public charter school, accepts only students who reside within Tulsa Public Schools boundaries, when there are more applicants than can be accepted, a random lottery open to the public determines new pupils. TSAS was selected as a 2015 Blue Ribbon School.

History 
TSAS was founded in 2001 as the city's first charter high school by Darla Coghill, Suzanne Lee, Linda Joyce Stromblad, and J. Evelyn Williamson. The group of educators primarily from Tulsa's Memorial High School, wanted to provide a college preparatory curriculum mixing liberal arts with sciences and mathematics. In the fall of 2011, Dr. Liesa Smith, a former TSAS English teacher, became the TSAS principal with former TSAS teacher and principal Eric Doss becoming the executive director. In the fall of 2017, Doss was replaced as executive director by Dr. Ellen McCoy. In the Spring of 2022, McCoy announced she would be relocating to Washington D.C. and the TSAS board replaced her with Jonathan Townsend as the new Executive Director for the 2022-2023 school year. TSAS is governed by its own board of trustees.

Academics 
The curriculum at TSAS is challenging and differentiated. High school students are all part of one of four “houses” which are diverse, equally rigorous graduation plans based on student and family preference and future goals. In all houses, Advanced Placement classes, internships, community service, and concurrent enrollment are emphasized, and graduation requirements exceed the state's requirements. In addition to the core curriculum in houses, TSAS offers an extensive catalog of elective courses such as visual art, printmaking, gardening, modern band, rock band, women and gender studies, culinary arts, quiz bowl, yoga, cycling, musical theatre, speech, debate, drama, film studies, zine journalism, cross country, darkroom photography, and extensive social/emotional support as well as an emphasis on innovation and disruption of educational inequity. The school year is divided into trimesters, and students take only five 70-minute classes per session.

Location
In 2012, TSAS announced plans to move the school to the former Barnard Elementary School building located at 2324 East 17th Street. Throughout the summer of 2012, staff and volunteers helped clean and revamp the old building. School started August 15, 2012.
On the morning of September 5, 2012, three weeks after school began, firefighters were called to the building. The building and nearly all of its contents were destroyed by fire. Tulsa Public Schools Superintendent Keith Ballard made the decision to offer TSAS the former Sequoyah Elementary building located at 3441 E. Archer St.

In 2016, TSAS made a final move to the Roosevelt building located at 1202 W Easton in Tulsa, OK. As stated on their website, "The additional space will allow the school to not only install many of the amenities lost in the fire, but to add 7th and later 6th and 8th grades to the school, expanding our legacy of quality schools to younger students."

TSAS Middle School 
Along with the high school portion of the school, as of 2016 TSAS expanded to include a new 7th grade class that became the 8th grade class in the following year. Middle school students are automatically admitted to TSAS High School without going through the lottery acceptance process again. Any siblings of students already accepted in either the Middle School or High School will have the option of entering TSAS without going through the lottery.

In August of 2016, Eric Doss remained executive director of the school with Dan Hahn stepping into the role of Middle Grades Principal. In the fall of 2020, under the leadership of Dr. Ellen McCoy (who became the executive director in 2017), TSAS added 6th grade and increased enrollment to 525 students grades 6-12.

References

External links
Official Site
Tulsa School of Arts and Sciences at edreform.com

Public high schools in Oklahoma
Schools in Tulsa, Oklahoma
Educational institutions established in 2001
Charter schools in Oklahoma
2001 establishments in Oklahoma